Rathnakar may refer to:

Rathnakar (actor), Indian actor
Kimmane Rathnakar, Indian politician from Karnataka